Kach Kurin (also Romanized as Kach Kūrīn; also known as Kajgūrīn and Qal‘eh-ye Tarān) is a village in Damen Rural District, in the Central District of Iranshahr County, Sistan and Baluchestan Province, Iran. At the 2006 census, its population was 106, in 23 families.

References 

Populated places in Iranshahr County